Microbial dark matter comprises the vast majority of microbial organisms (usually bacteria and archaea) that microbiologists are unable to culture in the laboratory, due to lack of knowledge or ability to supply the required growth conditions. Microbial dark matter is unrelated to the dark matter of physics and cosmology, but is so-called for the difficulty in effectively studying it as a result of its inability to be cultured by current methods. It is difficult to estimate its relative magnitude, but the accepted gross estimate is that as little as one percent of microbial species in a given ecological niche are culturable. In recent years, more effort has been directed towards deciphering  microbial dark matter by means of recovering genome DNA sequences from environmental samples via culture independent methods such as single cell genomics and metagenomics. These studies have enabled insights into the evolutionary history and the metabolism of the sequenced genomes, providing valuable knowledge required for the cultivation of microbial dark matter lineages.

See also
 Microbial ecology

References

External links 
 Microbial Dark Matter project site

Molecular biology
Molecular biology techniques
Microbiology